The Sikorsky VS-44 was a large four-engined flying boat built in the United States in the early 1940s by Sikorsky Aircraft. Based on the XPBS-1 patrol bomber, the VS-44 was designed primarily for the transatlantic passenger market, with a capacity of 40+ passengers. Three units were produced: Excalibur, Excambian, and Exeter, plus two XPBS-1 prototypes.

Development
In the early 1930s, the primary mode of long-distance air travel over oceans was in flying boats, due to the ease of constructing docking facilities on shore without having to construct runways, and the possibility of malfunction forcing a sea landing.  One flying boat designer was Russian immigrant Igor Sikorsky who had founded Sikorsky Aero Engineering Company when he came to the US in 1919. In 1930, his company became a subsidiary of United Aircraft.

XPBS-1 patrol bomber
In March 1935, the United States Navy was making plans for a new patrol bomber that would have increased performance and weapon load capability from their newly procured Consolidated YP3Y-1.  Prototypes were ordered from Sikorsky in June 1935 and Consolidated Aircraft in July 1936. Sikorsky's entry, the XPBS-1 (Bureau Number 9995), made its first flight on 9 September 1937, the Consolidated XPB2Y-1 on 17 December of the same year.
  

 
The XPBS-1 was evaluated by the National Advisory Committee for Aeronautics (NACA) in 1938, but the Navy contract went to Consolidated.  The XPBS-1 remained in naval service, temporarily operated by Patrol Wing Five at Norfolk, Virginia in 1939, then by Patrol Wing Two at Pearl Harbor, Hawaii, until it was finally assigned to transport squadron VR-2 at Naval Air Station Alameda, in 1940. On 30 June 1942, the XPBS-1 hit a submerged log upon landing at NAS Alameda. Among its passengers was CINCPAC Admiral Chester W. Nimitz who suffered minor injuries. One member of the flight crew, Lieutenant Thomas M. Roscoe, died. The XPBS-1 sank and was lost.

VS-44 commercial flying boat
By 1940 Sikorsky had merged with Chance Vought under the umbrella of United Aircraft and hoped to regain the Pan Am Clipper routes once serviced by their S-42 with the new Vought-Sikorsky VS-44, based on the XPBS-1.

The VS-44 brought home several new world records after it went into operation, but missed out on a Pan Am contract, which instead purchased the Martin M-130 and later the Boeing 314 Clipper. The VS-44's limited production would never recoup the development costs.

Operational service

Commercial service
American Export Airlines (AEA) ordered three VS-44s, dubbed ‘Flying Aces’ and named Excalibur (NX41880; later as NC41880), Excambian (no NX; later as NC41881), and Exeter (no NX; later as NC41882) after the parent company's Four Aces passenger liners. AEA had grown out of the American Export Lines steamship line, so naturally these planes gave nothing away to cruise ships. Sikorsky's standard of luxury boasted full-length beds, dressing rooms, full galley, snack bar, lounge and fully controlled ventilation.

World War II

With the American entry into World War II, 200 of the nation's 360 airliners were requisitioned for military service. AEA's three VS-44's, now with the Navy designation JR2S-1, continued flying between New York and Foynes, Ireland, carrying passengers, freight and materiel. The first VS-44, Excalibur, crashed on takeoff in 1942 at Botwood, Newfoundland, killing 11 of 37 aboard. A proposed licensed version of the VS-44 to be built by Nash-Kelvinator, the JRK-1, was canceled due to the availability of the impressed JR2S aircraft.

Postwar service
After the war, the two remaining VS-44s continued to fly for AEA, now renamed American Overseas Airlines (AOA) and operated by American Airlines.

In 1946, Exeter was sold to TACI of Montevideo, Uruguay, as CX-AIR. It crashed on August 15, 1947 while landing in the River Plate off Montevideo when (allegedly) returning from a smuggling flight to Paraguayan rebels. Four out of the five crew were killed, but both passengers survived.

In 1949, AOA sold Excambian to Tampico Airlines.  A short-lived effort to restore the only remaining VS-44 to run freight in the Amazon was unsuccessful, leaving the flying boat stranded in Ancon Harbor, Peru.

By the late 1950s, two Southern California businessmen had heard of the Excambians plight and had her ferried to Long Beach, where restoration work began. Dick Probert and Walter von Kleinsmid of Avalon Air Transport, (AAT) thought the VS-44 would be perfect for the Catalina tourist trade. AAT named her Mother Goose, to complement the line's Grumman Goose amphibians, and plans were made to utilize her for summer travel. In the winter, N41881 would undergo maintenance. Avalon Air Transport was later renamed Catalina Air Lines and continued to operate the aircraft until the late 1960s.

Excambian carried thousands of passengers for AAT until 1967 when it was sold to Charles Blair of Antilles Air Boats. Blair, husband of actress Maureen O'Hara, acquired Excambian to ferry passengers among the Virgin Islands including service to the Charlotte Amalie Harbor Seaplane Base on St. Thomas and the Christiansted Harbor Seaplane Base on St. Croix. On January 3, 1969 she was extensively damaged by rocks while taxiing at Charlotte Amalie, US Virgin Islands. Damaged beyond economic repair, it was beached in March 1972 and converted into a hot dog stand.

Restoration and museum

In 1976, Excambian was donated by Charles Blair, original Chief Pilot of the VS-44, to the National Naval Aviation Museum at NAS Pensacola, Florida. In 1983, the Navy transferred the aircraft on permanent loan to the New England Air Museum in Windsor Locks, Connecticut. The heavily corroded Flying Boat was then shipped by barge from the Gulf of Mexico to Bridgeport, CT. Unloaded by crane, it was trucked a short distance to the Sikorsky Memorial Airport in Stratford, CT. A temporary Nissen hut-style hangar was erected at the airport in front of hangars three and four for the project. This put the VS-44A less than 1000 feet away from the original hangar she was built in, across the street at the (then) Avco Lycoming Engine Plant. In 1987 the restoration of the Excambian began, and it was decided to restore the rare flying boat to its post-WWII American Export Airlines livery. The restoration was conducted by a team of highly trained volunteers, many of them former Sikorsky workers who had originally built the VS-44As there 50 years ago. The combined support from Sikorsky and Avco Lycoming was crucial for the success of the restoration. On June 18, 1997, after ten years of restoration, the VS-44A was transferred to the New England Air Museum. It was there that the plane was assembled and painted. In October 1998 a ceremony was held to dedicate the aircraft. The "Excambian" is the last remaining American-built commercial trans-ocean four-engine flying boat. After the project had been completed, the restoration team located in Stratford began looking at creating its own museum. With the assistance of local senator George "Doc" Gunther, the Connecticut Air & Space Center was founded in 1998. Today the museum is located in building 6, the former Chance Vought R&D Experimental hangar.

Specifications (VS-44A)

References

Notes

Bibliography
Bill Maloney's pictures of the VS44A at the New England Air Museum
Popular Science, November 1941,  "New Planes For Ocean Travel"  early article on VS-44 with cutaway drawing of VS-44 on page 83 of three page article.
"Sikorsky VS-44 Flying Boat" YouTube excellent photos

External links

 Video slideshow of Sikorsky VS-44 Flying Boats

VS-044
1940s United States airliners
Flying boats
Four-engined tractor aircraft
High-wing aircraft
Four-engined piston aircraft